I Visionari is an album by Stefano Bollani.

Music and recording
The core band is a quintet led by pianist Stefano Bollani. The material is mostly instrumentals.

Release and reception
I Visionari was released as a double-CD by Label Bleu in 2006. Critic John Fordham wrote: "A kind of Italian Django Bates with a more orthodox lyrical sense, Bollani keeps the surprises coming, wrapped in some fine writing. A good place for newcomers to start."

Track listing 
All songs are by Stefano Bollani, except as noted.

Disc A
 "La Sicilia" – 6:15
 "Il Fiore Canta e poi Svanisce" – 6:22
 "Visione Numero Uno" – 10:35
 "Carnevale di Dunkerque" – 5:50
 "Storta Va" – 6:39
 "Che Cosa Sono le Nuvole" (Domenico Modugno / Pier Paolo Pasolini) – 4:33

Disc B
 "Intro" (Mark Feldman, Nico Gori, Mirko Guerrini) – 1:37
 "Per Scordarti di Me" – 1:55
 "Visione Numero Due" – 5:20
 "Antichi Insediamenti Urbani" – 7:27
 "Alone Together" (Howard Dietz / Arthur Schwartz) – 4:04
 "Scartabello" – 5:56
 "Mamma Mia Dammi Cento Lire" (traditional) – 3:34
 "Impro" (Federico Spinetti) – 1:22
 "Quando la Morte Verrà a Prendermi" – 2:15
 "Sardità" – 3:36
 "Visione Numero Tre" – 5:54

Personnel
Stefano Bollani – piano, vocals (track A6)
Mirko Guerrini – tenor sax, soprano sax, flute
Nico Gori – clarinet, bass clarinet
Federico Spinetti – bass
Cristiano Calcagnile – drums
Mark Feldman – violin (tracks A2, B1, B6)
Paolo Fresu – trumpet (track B10)
Petra Magoni – vocals (track B2, B7)

Source:

References

Post-bop albums
Stefano Bollani albums
2006 albums